Camacolaimidae is a family of nematodes belonging to the order Araeolaimida.

Genera:
 Listia Blome, 1982
 Loveninema Holovachov & Boström, 2012
 Neocamacolaimus Holovachov & Boström, 2014
 Notacamacolaimus Allgén, 1959
 Onchiolistia Blome, 2002
 Setostephanolaimus Tchesunov, 1994
 Smithsoninema Hope & Tchesunov, 1999

References

Nematodes